José Ignacio Riquelme Galiana (born 17 August 1967) is a Spanish retired footballer who played as a forward, and is a current manager.

Playing career
Born in El Cantón de Abanilla, Abanilla, Murcia, Riquelme represented Kelme CF as a youth, and subsequently moved to Elche CF. Initially assigned to the reserves, he made his first team – and La Liga – debut on 27 November 1988, coming on as a second-half substitute in a 0–1 home loss against Real Oviedo.

Galiana left the club in 1989, and subsequently resumed his career in the lower leagues, representing Imperial de Murcia CF, Zamora CF, Pinoso CF, UDA Gramenet, Alicante CF, CF Lorca Deportiva, UD Horadada, Ciudad de Murcia, Torrellano CF and Santa Pola CF. He retired with the latter at the age of 36.

Managerial career
After stints with Elche's youth sides, Galiana's first club in charge was Orihuela CF's B-team in 2008. A spell with CD Alone de Guardamar followed, and on 27 October 2009, he was appointed Novelda CF manager in Tercera División.

In March 2012, Galiana was named manager of Segunda División B side Lorca Atlético CF. After suffering relegation, he remained without a club for roughly a year before taking over CD Eldense.

On 26 June 2014, Galiana was appointed at the helm of CD Torrevieja. Sacked the following March, he subsequently returned to Eldense.

On 21 October 2016, Galiana moved abroad for the first time in his career and was appointed manager of Uruguayan Primera División side Sud América, becoming the first Spanish manager to train in the country. He was relieved from his duties on 24 March of the following year, and joined CF Lorca Deportiva on 11 April.

On 10 August 2017, despite taking the club to their promotion to the third division for the first time ever, Galiana was sacked. On 19 September, he was named manager of CD Alcoyano.

References

External links

1967 births
Living people
Spanish footballers
Footballers from the Region of Murcia
Association football forwards
La Liga players
Segunda División B players
Tercera División players
Elche CF Ilicitano footballers
Elche CF players
Real Murcia Imperial players
Zamora CF footballers
Getafe CF footballers
UDA Gramenet footballers
Alicante CF footballers
UD Horadada players
Ciudad de Murcia footballers
Spanish football managers
CD Eldense managers
CD Alcoyano managers
Spanish expatriate football managers
Expatriate football managers in Uruguay